Ištvan Semeredi (born 8 April 1948) is a Yugoslav wrestler. He competed in the men's Greco-Roman +100 kg at the 1972 Summer Olympics.

References

1948 births
Living people
Yugoslav male sport wrestlers
Olympic wrestlers of Yugoslavia
Wrestlers at the 1972 Summer Olympics
Place of birth missing (living people)